These are the results of the athletics competition at the 2005 Islamic Solidarity Games which took place on April 12–15, 2005 in Mecca, Saudi Arabia.

Results

100 meters

Heats – April 12Wind:Heat 1: +0.3 m/s, Heat 2: 0.0 m/s, Heat 3: -0.3 m/s, Heat 4: -0.9 m/s

Semi-finals – April 12Wind:Heat 1: +0.5 m/s, Heat 2: +0.2 m/s

Final – April 13Wind:+0.8 m/s

200 meters

Heats – April 14Wind:Heat 1: +1.4 m/s, Heat 2: -1.2 m/s, Heat 3: -1.2 m/s, Heat 4: +1.3 m/s, Heat 5: +0.4 m/s

Semi-finals – April 14Wind:Heat 1: +0.3 m/s, Heat 2: 0.0 m/s

Final – April 15Wind:0.0 m/s

400 meters

Heats – April 12

Semi-finals – April 13

Final – April 14

800 meters

Heats – April 12

Final – April 13

1500 meters

Heats – April 14

Final – April 15

5000 meters
April 15

10,000 meters
April 12

Marathon
April 15

110 meters hurdles

Heats – April 15Wind:Heat 1: 0.0 m/s, Heat 2: -1.1 m/s, Heat 3: +0.3 m/s

Final – April 15Wind:+1.2 m/s

400 meters hurdles

Heats – April 12

Final – April 13

3000 meters steeplechase
April 14

4 × 100 meters relay
April 15

4 × 400 meters relay
April 15

20 kilometers walk
April 12

High jump
April 15

Pole vault
April 13

Long jump
April 13

Triple jump
April 14

Shot put
April 12

Discus throw
April 13

Hammer throw
April 14

Javelin throw
April 15

Decathlon
April 14–15

References
Results

Islamic Solidarity Games
2005